Patheingyi is a town in the Mandalay Region of central Myanmar.

References

External links
Satellite map at Maplandia.com

Populated places in Mandalay Region